Exiguobacterium aquaticum is a Gram-positive, short rod-shaped and motile bacterium from the genus of Exiguobacterium which has been isolated from water from the Tikkar Tal Lake in Haryana.

References

 

Bacillaceae
Bacteria described in 2012